Clare Jacqueline Wood (born 8 March 1968) is a former British number 1 tennis player from Great Britain who began playing professionally in 1984 and retired in 1998. Over the course of her career, she reached a career-high singles ranking of world No. 77 in singles (achieved 2 May 1994) and No. 59 in doubles (achieved 21 October 1996). Wood won one ITF singles title and six in doubles as well as won a WTA doubles title at the 1992 Wellington Classic, having been the runner-up the previous year. At the time of her retirement, she had a 212–223 singles win–loss record with notable wins over Jo Durie and Mary Pierce.

After her retirement from professional competition, Wood became a tennis officiator. From 1999 until 2002, she was a tournament supervisor on the WTA Tour, and from 2002 onward, she was an assistant referee at Wimbledon where she was responsible for the qualifying and junior events. In 2004, she was an assistant referee at the 2004 Olympic tennis event, and in 2008, it was announced that she would fulfil, the role of tennis competition manager at the 2012 Olympic Games.

Wightman Cup
When Wood lost to Jennifer Capriati on 14 September 1989, her opponent became the youngest ever Wightman Cup player, and the first player for four years to win a Wightman Cup match 6–0, 6–0.

Fed Cup
Wood played 28 singles and 24 doubles matches for Great Britain in the Fed Cup from 1988 to 1997.

Olympic Games
Wood represented the United Kingdom in the Olympic Games in 1988, 1992 and 1996,

WTA tour and ITF circuit finals

Singles: 2 (1–1)

Doubles: 11 (7–4)

Grand Slam performance timelines

Singles

Doubles

Mixed doubles

References

External links
 
 
 
 
 

1968 births
Living people
English sportspeople of South African descent
English female tennis players
Olympic tennis players of Great Britain
People from Zululand District Municipality
Tennis players at the 1988 Summer Olympics
Tennis players at the 1992 Summer Olympics
Tennis players at the 1996 Summer Olympics
British female tennis players